The Morris Museum of Art in Augusta, Georgia was established in 1985 as a non-profit foundation by William S. Morris III, publisher of The Augusta Chronicle, in memory of his parents, as the first museum dedicated to the collection and exhibition of art and artists of the American South.

In 1989, Morris bought 230 pictures for the museum from Southern art collector Robert P. Coggins, with Keith Claussen appointed museum director the following year. On September 26, 1992, "The Morris" opened to the public, attracting over 10,000 visitors in the first two months.

With more than 3,000 works in its permanent collection, the museum hosts changing exhibitions, educational programs, musical events, and hands-on art programs. The museum is located adjacent to Riverwalk Augusta and the Savannah River.

See also

Arts and culture in Augusta, Georgia

External links
 Morris Museum of Art — official website

Museums in Augusta, Georgia
Museums of American art
Art museums and galleries in Georgia (U.S. state)
Art museums established in 1992
1992 establishments in Georgia (U.S. state)
Art in Georgia (U.S. state)
Southern art